In mathematics and theoretical physics, a tensor is antisymmetric on (or with respect to) an index subset if it alternates sign (+/−) when any two indices of the subset are interchanged. The index subset must generally either be all covariant or all contravariant.

For example,

holds when the tensor is antisymmetric with respect to its first three indices.

If a tensor changes sign under exchange of each pair of its indices, then the tensor is completely (or totally) antisymmetric.  A completely antisymmetric covariant tensor field of order  may be referred to as a differential -form, and a completely antisymmetric contravariant tensor field may be referred to as a -vector field.

Antisymmetric and symmetric tensors

For a general tensor U with components  and a pair of indices  and  U has symmetric and antisymmetric parts defined as:

{|
|-
|  || || (symmetric part)
|-
|  || ||(antisymmetric part).
|}
 
Similar definitions can be given for other pairs of indices.  As the term "part" suggests, a tensor is the sum of its symmetric part and antisymmetric part for a given pair of indices, as in

Notation

A shorthand notation for anti-symmetrization is denoted by a pair of square brackets. For example, in arbitrary dimensions, for an order 2 covariant tensor M,

and for an order 3 covariant tensor T,

In any 2 and 3 dimensions, these can be written as

where  is the generalized Kronecker delta, and we use the Einstein notation to summation over like indices.

More generally, irrespective of the number of dimensions, antisymmetrization over  indices may be expressed as

In general, every tensor of rank 2 can be decomposed into a symmetric and anti-symmetric pair as:

This decomposition is not in general true for tensors of rank 3 or more, which have more complex symmetries.

Examples

Totally antisymmetric tensors include:

 Trivially, all scalars and vectors (tensors of order 0 and 1) are totally antisymmetric (as well as being totally symmetric).
 The electromagnetic tensor,  in electromagnetism.
 The Riemannian volume form on a pseudo-Riemannian manifold.

See also

Notes

References

External links

 Antisymmetric Tensor – mathworld.wolfram.com

Tensors